Tristan Démétrius (born 8 February 2005) in Port-au-prince, Haiti, he is a professional footballer who currently plays as a forward for Saprissa.

Career statistics

Club

Notes

References

2005 births
Living people
Haitian footballers
Association football forwards
Deportivo Saprissa players
Liga FPD players
Haitian expatriate footballers
Haitian expatriate sportspeople in Costa Rica
Expatriate footballers in Costa Rica